Alison Bell (born 21 September 1966) is an English journalist and radio presenter.

Career 
In the mid-1990s Bell lived in Wellington, New Zealand and was briefly a presenter on local radio station The Breeze.

Bell was one of the launch presenters for the ITN News Channel in August 2000, presenting various programmes during the day, most notably the lunchtime slot between 12 noon and 2pm. 2003 saw her move to Sky News, where she presented the Sunrise programme weekday mornings.

A year later, she moved to CNN International. She resigned from that position in July 2004, after her arrest outside a restaurant with James Hewitt.

She then joined London radio station LBC 97.3, presenting shows in various timeslots, before presenting a regular show on Friday nights until April 2006. She remained with the station thereafter as a fill-in presenter.

In late 2004 she launched Globell Communications, a media consultancy firm for business professionals and companies.

From 24 September 2007 and until 4 January 2008, Bell presented an afternoon show on LBC 97.3 from 1pm-4pm, in a topical debate show called "Afternoon Delight".

Personal life 
Bell's hobbies include music, travel, tennis, swimming and rollerblading.  A frequent traveller, she is a regular visitor to Australia where her parents now live.

In July 2004, Bell was arrested outside a restaurant on suspicion of possessing cocaine, together with former British Army officer James Hewitt, who had been romantically linked with Diana, Princess of Wales in the 1990s. Hewitt and Bell had met in April 2004 when presenting a programme for LBC radio. Hewitt was given a warning and Bell was released without charge. She has also appeared as a poker player on Celebrity Poker Club, on which Hewitt also participated.

References 

1966 births
Living people
English women journalists
English radio presenters
ITN newsreaders and journalists
British women television journalists
British women radio presenters